Anderson Peak is a mountain on the Mount San Gorgonio crestline in Southern California's San Gorgonio Wilderness, which is part of the San Bernardino National Forest. Although not above the tree line, snow tends to cover the crest from the northern hemisphere early winter until late spring.

References

External links 
 

Mountains of San Bernardino County, California
Mountains of Southern California